Mokhtar Amir Lamhene (born January 18, 1990 in Tizi Ouzou) is an Algerian football player. He currently plays for JSM Skikda in the Algerian Ligue Professionnelle 2.

External links
 DZFoot Profile
 

1990 births
Living people
Algerian footballers
Algeria youth international footballers
Algerian Ligue Professionnelle 1 players
Footballers from Tizi Ouzou
Kabyle people
JS Kabylie players
Association football midfielders
AS Aïn M'lila players
21st-century Algerian people